Festuca gigantea, or giant fescue, is a plant species in the grass family, Poaceae. Because this and other members of Festuca subgenus Schedonorus have more in common morphologically with members of the genus Lolium than with Festuca and often produce fertile hybrids with other Lolium species, Festuca gigantea has been recently published as Lolium giganteum  and then as Schedonorus giganteus . Sources vary as to which placement is more acceptable.

Description

This grass can grow up to 2 metres.  It is loosely tufted, hairless, and has auricles.  It has dark red-purple leaf nodes, and there are six 8–13 mm long spikelets. Festuca Gigantea have long awns, forming flowers during the July to August period.

It is a common plant found especially on heavy, neutral  and calcerous soils, in woodland, hedge banks and shady places.  It is said to grow best in moist woods.

Festuca gigantea produces fertile hybrids with perennial ryegrass and Italian ryegrass, hence the confusion with its phylogeny and identification.

Nutrition value

Cattle and horses will readily eat its abundant foliage.

Similar species

Festuca altissima also known as Wood Fescue, is similar but is found in rocky woods, has spikelets which droop much more but are half as long, and ligules 3mm long.

References

gigantea